Labial affricate may refer to:
Voiceless labiodental affricate, a consonant sound written as 
Voiced labiodental affricate, a consonant sound written as